The 2020 FIA Formula 2 Championship was a motor racing championship for Formula 2 cars, sanctioned by the Fédération Internationale de l'Automobile (FIA). The championship was the fifty-fourth season of Formula 2 racing and the fourth season run under the FIA Formula 2 Championship moniker. It is an open-wheel racing category, that serves as the second tier of formula racing in the FIA Global Pathway. The category was run in support of selected rounds of the 2020 FIA Formula One World Championship. As the championship was a spec series, all teams and drivers competing in the championship ran the same car, the Dallara F2 2018.

Nyck de Vries was the 2019 drivers' champion, having won the title at the penultimate round of the 2019 championship in Russia, thus Mick Schumacher became the next driver to win the title at the final round in the Outer layout of the Bahrain International Circuit with 14 points ahead of runner-up Callum Ilott. DAMS were the reigning teams' champions, having secured their first Formula 2 title in Abu Dhabi. Prema Racing became the next team to clinch teams' title for the first time, after the finish of the feature race in the Outer layout of the Bahrain International Circuit.

2020 was due to be the final season with the Dallara F2 2018 chassis package which debuted in 2018 with a new chassis introduced for 2021. This was delayed for another three seasons due to the COVID-19 pandemic.

Entries
The following teams and drivers are under contract to compete in the 2020 championship. As the championship is a spec series, all competitors race with an identical Dallara F2 2018 chassis with a V6 turbo engine developed by Mecachrome and with tyres supplied by Pirelli.

Team changes
Hitech Grand Prix joined the championship, bringing the total number of teams up to eleven. HWA Racelab replaced Arden International on the grid. HWA had formed a technical partnership with the team in 2019.

Driver changes 
Reigning team champions DAMS fielded a new driver line-up. Sérgio Sette Câmara left to compete in Super Formula and Nicholas Latifi graduated to Formula One with Williams. They were replaced by Sean Gelael, who left Prema Racing, and two-time Macau Grand Prix winner Dan Ticktum.

Luca Ghiotto left UNI-Virtuosi to join the new Hitech Grand Prix team. Callum Ilott moved from Sauber Junior Team by Charouz to replace him.

Reigning champion Nyck de Vries left ART Grand Prix and the championship to join Mercedes in Formula E. Nikita Mazepin also left the team to join Ghiotto at Hitech Grand Prix. Their seats were taken by Marcus Armstrong and Christian Lundgaard, who finished second and sixth respectively in the 2019 FIA Formula 3 Championship. Lundgaard had made his Formula 2 debut with Trident at the final round of the 2019 season.

Carlin signed two new drivers for 2020. They were replaced by Red Bull juniors Jehan Daruvala and Yuki Tsunoda, who graduated from the FIA Formula 3 Championship having finished third and ninth respectively in 2019.

Campos Racing did not retain reigning Euroformula Open champion Marino Sato, who competed for the team in the final rounds of 2019. Sato moved to Trident, with Campos hiring Formula 3 Brasil champion Guilherme Samaia to replace him.

Charouz Racing System driver Juan Manuel Correa was ruled out of the 2020 championship due to his injuries from the 2019 Spa-Francorchamps FIA Formula 2 round, while Matevos Isaakyan—who replaced Correa for the final rounds of the 2019 championship—was not retained. The team signed 2019 FIA Formula 3 fifth-placed finisher Pedro Piquet to partner Louis Delétraz for 2020.

Jordan King and Mahaveer Raghunathan both left MP Motorsport and the championship. The team hired 2018 Euroformula Open champion Felipe Drugovich to partner Nobuharu Matsushita.

BWT HWA Racelab retained Artem Markelov, who raced for the team in the final rounds of 2019 as a replacement for the late Anthoine Hubert. Tatiana Calderón left the championship to compete in Super Formula and Giuliano Alesi switched from Trident to replace her.

Reigning FIA Formula 3 champion Robert Shwartzman graduated to the championship with Prema Racing, replacing Sean Gelael.

Trident hired Roy Nissany, who last competed in Formula 2 in 2018 with Campos, to partner Marino Sato.

Midseason changes
Sean Gelael suffered a broken vertebra during the last lap of the feature race in Barcelona when he collided with Jack Aitken. As a result, Gelael was declared unfit to participate in Spa and the following three rounds, leaving his DAMS seat vacant. The team hired Red Bull Junior driver Jüri Vips as an interim driver.

Matsushita left the MP Motorsport team after the Mugello round, and Alesi moved across from BWT HWA Racelab to replace him with immediate effect. HWA's FIA Formula 3 Championship driver Jake Hughes graduated to Formula 2 to replace Alesi.

2020 FIA Formula 3 Championship runner-up Théo Pourchaire was promoted to Formula 2 for the last two races, replacing Hughes at BWT HWA Racelab.

At the Formula One Sakhir Grand Prix, Campos Racing driver Jack Aitken was called up to the Williams Formula One team as a replacement for 2018 Formula 2 champion George Russell, who replaced an absent Lewis Hamilton. Ralph Boschung stood in for Aitken for the final round of the championship.

Calendar
Both the original and revised calendars had twelve rounds scheduled to take place as part of the 2020 championship.

Calendar changes
The Circuit Paul Ricard round that was run in support of the French Grand Prix was removed from the calendar. It was replaced by a round at the Circuit Zandvoort, running in support of the revived Dutch Grand Prix. The Bahrain and Barcelona rounds were postponed in response to the COVID-19 pandemic, while the Zandvoort, Monaco and Baku rounds were cancelled alongside the Dutch, Monaco and Azerbaijan Grands Prix. A revised calendar was published in June 2020, featuring two rounds at the Red Bull Ring and two at the Silverstone Circuit. On 10 July 2020, Mugello was added as the ninth round of the season. It was the first time for this circuit to be featured in the schedule of the main Formula One feeder series since the 1997 International Formula 3000 Championship. On 29 July 2020, Sochi was added to the calendar as the tenth round of the season. The championship used the Outer Circuit layout for the season finale at Bahrain.

Regulation changes

Technical changes
The conventional 330 mm wheel rims that had been used since 2005 were retired.

Season report

Opening rounds
UNI-Virtuosi's Guanyu Zhou started the season opener at the Red Bull Ring from pole position alongside series debutant Felipe Drugovich in second place. Zhou led the majority of the race and fought closely with teammate Callum Ilott and Prema Racing's Mick Schumacher. A technical issue later dropped Zhou to the back and Schumacher's chance of victory was lost after a trip through the gravel at turn six, allowing Ilott to claim his first Formula 2 race victory. Drugovich started the sprint race on pole position by virtue of finishing eighth in the feature race. He maintained the lead for the whole race distance to take his debut win in Formula 2. The opening round finished with Ilott leading the championship, four points ahead of Prema's Robert Shwartzman.

Formula 2 remained at the Red Bull Ring on the following weekend, where Carlin's Yuki Tsunoda took pole position. The feature race began under safety car conditions due to wet weather. Tsunoda led for most of the race, but radio issues prevented him from hearing his team's call to enter the pits, causing the gap behind him to close as his tyres degraded. After eventually making a pit stop, he had lost position to Shwartzman, Ilott and Zhou. Tsunoda recovered to second place but was unable to overtake Shwartzman, who took his first Formula 2 victory and the championship lead. Tsunoda and Shwartzman both retired from the sprint race, Tsunoda with a suspected clutch issue and Shwartzman after spinning on the opening lap. ART Grand Prix's Christian Lundgaard overtook reverse-grid pole sitter Dan Ticktum to claim his maiden Formula 2 victory. Despite his retirement, Shwartzman maintained the lead of the championship by five points over Ilott. 

Ilott claimed pole position in the wet qualifying session at the Hungaroring. During the feature race he traded the lead with Schumacher, but fell down the order in the closing laps as his medium-compound tyres degraded. Conversely, Shwartzman and Hitech Grand Prix's Nikita Mazepin, who started the race 11th and 16th respectively, switched from medium to soft-compound tyres later in the race. This proved to be the superior strategy and Shwartzman came through the field to take his second consecutive feature race victory, with Mazepin second. Ilott started on pole position for the sprint race. Whilst most drivers elected to make a pit stop, Hitech's Luca Ghiotto did not. This left Ghiotto in the lead with a 40 second gap behind to Ilott, which rapidly closed over the final ten laps. Ilott was ultimately unable to pass Ghiotto, who took his sixth Formula 2 victory by less than half a second. After the Hungaroring round, Shwartzman had extended his championship lead over Ilott to 18 points.

Mid-season
The first round at Silverstone saw MP Motorsport's Felipe Drugovich take his team's first ever Formula 2 pole position, whilst championship leader Shwartzman qualified 18th. Second-placed Ilott stalled on the formation lap and was forced to start from the pit lane. Schumacher took the lead at the start, but was overtaken by Mazepin soon after. Mazepin led the rest of the race to take his maiden Formula 2 race win. Dan Ticktum started the sprint race from pole position and maintained his lead. Ilott, who had been running closely behind Ticktum in the final laps, was forced into retirement after a spin, and Ticktum held off Christian Lundgaard on the final lap to achieve his first victory. Despite scoring no points, Shwartzman held his championship lead over Ilott by eight points after the fourth round.

Ilott returned to pole position for the second round at Silverstone and led the entire feature race to take his second victory of the season. Shwartzman finished eighth, losing his championship lead to Ilott but giving him reverse-grid pole position for the sprint race. He led for most of the race with teammate Schumacher close behind, but the two collided with two laps remaining, damaging Shwartzman's front wing and relegating him to the back. This allowed Yuki Tsunoda through to claim his first Formula 2 race win. After round five, Ilott led the championship by 19 points over Christian Lundgaard.

Ilott again took pole position at the Circuit de Barcelona-Catalunya. He traded the lead of the race with Shwartzman and Schumacher but had reclaimed first place by lap 25, when a collision between Sean Gelael and Giuliano Alesi brought out the safety car. Whilst most drivers had made a pit stop earlier in the race after starting on soft-compound tyres, MP Motorsport's Nobuharu Matsushita had stayed out after starting from 18th place on hard tyres. He made his first stop under safety car conditions, elevating him to third place. He was then able to pass Ilott and Tsunoda to take the lead and achieve MP Motorsport's first ever Formula 2 feature race victory. A collision between Gelael and Jack Aitken on the final lap resulted in Gelael suffering a broken vertebra, forcing him to miss the sprint race. Luca Ghiotto began the sprint race on pole position but was passed by Felipe Drugovich at the start, who held the position to take his second victory of the season. Ilott kept the championship lead after round six by 18 points over Shwartzman.

Tsunoda achieved his second pole position in the seventh round at Spa-Francorchamps, where Jüri Vips made his Formula 2 debut replacing the injured Gelael at DAMS. Tsunoda was closely followed by Nikita Mazepin in the feature race until a slow pit stop handed Mazepin the lead. Mazepin held off attacks from Tsunoda to cross the line in first place, but he was issued with a time penalty for forcing Tsunoda off the track, awarding Tsunoda his second win of the season. Trident's Roy Nissany started on pole position for the sprint race, in which championship leader Ilott was forced into retirement after a collision with Tsunoda. Nissany and Dan Ticktum traded the lead in the early laps before the two collided, sending Nissany into the barriers. This allowed Shwartzman through to claim his third win of the season, as well as the lead of the championship by 10 points over Ilott.

Ilott repeated his  success in qualifying at Monza, claiming pole position. Mick Schumacher, who started seventh, passed multiple drivers at the start to take second behind Ilott at the first corner. Ilott stalled his car during his pit stop, dropping him to the back of the field and allowing Schumacher through to take his first victory of the season. Charouz Racing System driver Louis Delétraz started on reverse-grid pole position, but was passed by Dan Ticktum before the first corner, who controlled the rest of the race to claim what would have been his second win of the season. However, Ticktum ran out of fuel on his return to the pits, and his team were not able to supply a sufficient fuel sample to the FIA. Thus, Ticktum was disqualified, and Ilott inherited the win. This allowed Ilott to retake the championship lead, six points ahead of Schumacher in second.

Closing rounds

Christian Lundgaard achieved his first pole position in qualifying at Mugello and controlled the feature race until the closing laps. Nikita Mazepin, who started 14th, was able to take advantage of an alternative tyre strategy and accidents ahead to claim the lead with two laps to go. He led a Hitech one-two at the finish line ahead of teammate Luca Ghiotto. Shwartzman, Ilott and Tsunoda all failed to score, allowing Schumacher to claim the championship lead for the first time after finishing fifth. HWA Racelab's Artem Markelov started on pole position in the sprint race, from which Mazepin and Ghiotto were eliminated after colliding with each other. Lundgaard took the lead of the race at the start and led the rest of the distance to take his second win of the season. Schumacher finished fourth ahead of Ilott in sixth, allowing Schumacher to extend his championship lead to eight points.

In Sochi, Tsunoda started the feature race from pole position. He was overtaken by Schumacher with nine laps remaining, who went on to take his second victory of the season. Title challenger Ilott finished third. The sprint race began with Guanyu Zhou on pole position. On lap seven of 21, Luca Ghiotto attempted an overtake on Campos driver Jack Aitken for fourth place around the outside of the long turn four. The drivers made contact and both crashed into the barriers at high-speed, after which Ghiotto's car caught fire. Both drivers escaped unharmed, but the race was red-flagged and not restarted since the barriers could not be repaired in time. Zhou was awarded the race win, his first in Formula 2. Half-points were given as less than 75% of the scheduled race distance was completed. After round 10, Schumacher's championship lead over Ilott had extended to 22 points.

Round 11 at the Bahrain International Circuit began with Ilott on pole position and championship leader Schumacher qualifying 10th. Ilott and Felipe Drugovich traded the lead during the feature race. Drugovich eventually built a gap and finished ahead of Ilott to claim his third victory of the season. Robert Shwartzman started the sprint race from pole position and converted this into his fourth win of the season. Ilott failed to score after colliding with Carlin's Jehan Daruvala and receiving a drive-through penalty. Schumacher finished seventh to hold his championship lead over Ilott by 14 points.

Yuki Tsunoda took his fourth pole position for the final round on Bahrain's outer layout. Ilott qualified ninth, with Schumacher only 18th after colliding with Roy Nissany in qualifying. Tsunoda, Shwartzman and Nikita Mazepin battled for the lead during the feature race, before Tsunoda built a gap and claimed his third win of the season. Ilott and Schumacher were classified fifth and sixth respectively after Mazepin was penalised for illegal defending. Schumacher recorded the fastest lap of the race, meaning his 14 point advantage in the championship went unchanged going into the final race and guaranteeing him the title if Ilott failed to finish the sprint race in the top two. Dan Ticktum took reverse-grid pole position and was later passed by Jehan Daruvala, who claimed his first Formula 2 victory. Schumacher locked his tyres multiple times during the race and made two pit stops, dropping him to the back. Ilott had run in third place but dropped back due to tyre degradation, eventually finishing outside the points. Schumacher crossed the line 18th to become the 2020 Formula 2 champion. 

Three drivers would graduate to Formula One at the end of the season. Champion Schumacher and fifth-placed Mazepin joined Haas F1 Team. Third-placed Tsunoda, who won the Anthoine Hubert Award as the highest-placed rookie in the championship, joined Scuderia AlphaTauri. Runner-up Ilott joined Scuderia Ferrari as a test driver.

Results and standings

Season summary

Scoring system
Points are awarded to the top 10 classified finishers in the Feature race, and to the top 8 classified finishers in the Sprint race. The pole-sitter in the feature race also receives four points, and two points is given to the driver who sets the fastest lap inside the top ten in both the feature and sprint races. No extra points are awarded to the pole-sitter in the sprint race as the grid for the sprint race is based on the results of the feature race with the top eight drivers having their positions reversed.

Feature race points

Sprint race points
Points are awarded to the top eight classified finishers, excluding the fastest lap points which are given to the top ten classified finishers.

Drivers' championship

Notes:
 – Drivers did not finish the race, but were classified as they completed more than 90% of the race distance.
 – Half points were awarded for the sprint race, as less than 75% of the scheduled distance was completed.

Teams' championship

Notes:
 – Drivers did not finish the race, but were classified as they completed more than 90% of the race distance.
  – Half points were awarded for the sprint race, as less than 75% of the scheduled distance was completed.

Notes

References

External links 
 FIA Formula 2 Championship official website

FIA Formula 2 Championship seasons
 
FIA Formula 2
Formula 2